Sweet Mama is the sixth full-length album by Canadian rock band The Respectables. It was released in 2009 by Universal Music Canada.

The first single from this album was "Sugar" feat. Gordie Johnson, and it was followed by "Sweet Mama".

Track listing
"Serves You Right"
"Sweet Mama"
"Got More Than I Wanted from Honky Tonkin' and Rock 'N' Roll"
"Sugar" 
"Tell Me Who"
"Say Yes, Say No"
"Telephone Call"
"Rain Down"
"Quick as Thieves"
"Devil in the Launderette "

References
Citations

2009 albums
Les Respectables albums
Universal Records albums